Young Juliette is a Canadian comedy-drama film, directed by Anne Émond and released in 2019. A semi-autobiographical coming of age story inspired by Émond's own teenage experiences, the film stars Alexane Jamieson as Juliette, an overweight and unpopular young girl who is bullied at her high school but learns how to fight back with her wit.

The film also stars Myriam Leblanc and Robin Aubert as Juliette's parents; Christophe Levac as her older brother Pierre-Luc; Léanne Désilets as her friend Léanne; Antoine DesRochers as her brother's best friend Liam, on whom Juliette has a romantic crush; Gabriel Beaudet as Arnaud, a classmate with Asperger syndrome whom Juliette defends from similar bullying; and Karl Farah and Stéphane Crête as teachers at her school.

The film opened in theatres on August 9, 2019.

Accolades

References

External links
 

2019 films
2010s coming-of-age comedy-drama films
Canadian coming-of-age comedy-drama films
Films shot in Quebec
Films set in Quebec
Films directed by Anne Émond
Lesbian-related films
Canadian LGBT-related films
School bullying
Films about obesity
2019 comedy-drama films
2010s French-language films
French-language Canadian films
2010s Canadian films